"This Woman" is a song written by Barry Gibb and Albhy Galuten and was performed by American country recording artist Kenny Rogers. It reached No. 2 in the US Adult Contemporary Chart and No. 23 in the US Pop Chart. It was published by Gibb Brothers Music and Unichappell Music.

RCA pushed "This Woman" to pop radio, but the country stations flipped to the song's B-side "Buried Treasure". In Germany, "This Woman"'s B-side was "Hold Me", another track from the album. This song was recorded in May 1983 released in late 1983 in the US, and early 1984 outside the US.

Personnel
Kenny Rogers — vocals
Barry Gibb — background vocals, guitar, arranger
Maurice Gibb — guitar, bass, synthesizer
Tim Renwick — guitar
George Terry — guitar
George Bitzer — piano, synthesizer
Albhy Galuten — piano, synthesizer, arranger
Ron Ziegler — drums
Joe Lala — percussion

Barry Gibb version
The original Barry Gibb demo version was released in late 2006 in iTunes on The Eyes That See in the Dark Demos The song has a choppy verse with a style more like Miami than Nashville., with Gibb singing lead and harmony on the chorus. Gibb's version of the song was recorded around January 1983, along with two songs, "You and I" and "Midsummer Nights".

Personnel
 Barry Gibb — lead and harmony vocal, guitar
 Albhy Galuten — piano, synthesizer

References

1983 songs
1983 singles
1984 singles
Kenny Rogers songs
Songs written by Barry Gibb
Barry Gibb songs
Song recordings produced by Barry Gibb
Songs written by Albhy Galuten
Song recordings produced by Albhy Galuten
RCA Records singles